Leandro Henrique Cypriano Catarino de Jesus (born 31 October 1987), known as Nando, is a Brazilian futsal player who plays as a defender for Dinamo-Samara.

References

1987 births
Living people
Futsal defenders
Futsal forwards
Brazilian expatriate sportspeople in Russia
Brazilian men's futsal players
Minas Tênis Clube players
Sportspeople from Belo Horizonte